Holocotylon is a genus of fungi in the family Agaricaceae. It was circumscribed by American mycologist Curtis Gates Lloyd in 1906 with H. brandegeeanum as the type species.

See also
List of Agaricaceae genera
List of Agaricales genera

References

Agaricaceae
Agaricales genera